South Gwinnett High School (SGHS) is a public high school for students in grades 9–12. The school is located in Snellville, Georgia, United States. It is part of the Gwinnett County Public Schools system, one of the 15 largest public school systems in the country. South Gwinnett is home to about 2,800 students. The school pulls from much of Southeastern Gwinnett county, including areas of Snellville and rural residential areas of Loganville.

The oldest of the four high schools in southeastern Gwinnett County, Snellville Consolidated High School was formed by the 1957 merger of Snellville High School (founded in 1923) and Grayson High School. As Gwinnett County saw extremely rapid population growth in the 1980s, Shiloh High School and Brookwood High School were opened to accommodate the rapid growth in South Gwinnett's school district. As Gwinnett County continued to see more students enter its system, South Gwinnett's district was split in half in 2000, when Grayson High School was "re-opened" at a new facility in Loganville.

Awards and recognition
South Gwinnett was ranked as the 711th best high school in the State of Georgia in 2002 by the Georgia Public Policy Foundation. The school was ranked 159th in the state and 12th (of 16) in Gwinnett County in the 2010 GPPF Report Card.

The school's mock trial team won the National High School Mock Trial Championship in 1995, held in Denver, Colorado.

South Gwinnett High School made Adequate Yearly Progress (AYP) in 2009. Under the No Child Left Behind act, a school makes AYP if it achieves the minimum levels of improvement determined by the state of Georgia in terms of student performance and other accountability measures.

Notable alumni
 21 Savage, rapper
 Clay Cook, singer-songwriter and Zac Brown Band guitarist
 David Greene, former NFL football player
 Jonathan Krause, NFL football player
 Mike Mercer, former college basketball player
 Nakia Sanford, former WNBA basketball player
 Rodgeriqus Smith, CFL football player
 Amanda Kyle Williams, crime writer
 Lou Williams, NBA basketball player

Notable faculty
 Larry Highbaugh, CFL football player

References

External links
South Gwinnett High School
Gwinnett County Public Schools
Band of Stars

Public high schools in Georgia (U.S. state)
Schools in Gwinnett County, Georgia
1957 establishments in Georgia (U.S. state)
Educational institutions established in 1957